Syllepte leonalis is a moth in the family Crambidae that is found in Sierra Leone. The species was first described by William Schaus and W. G. Clements in 1893.

References

leonalis
Moths of Africa
Moths described in 1893